Juhi Chawla is an Indian actress who primarily works  in Bollywood films, in addition to Bengali, Punjabi, Malayalam, Tamil, Kannada and Telugu films. The winner of Miss India 1984 Pageant, She made her acting debut with Sultanat in 1986. Her first commercial success was the blockbuster South Indian Film Premaloka (1987). She won the Filmfare Award for Lux New Face of the Year and received a nomination for Filmfare Best Actress Award, for the critical and commercial success Qayamat Se Qayamat Tak (1988), which also established her as an overnight star. She rose to prominence with films like  Amar Prem (1989), Vicky Daada (1989), Love Love Love (1989), Pratibandh  (1990), Swarg (1990), Benaam Badsha (1991), Bol Radha Bol (1992) and Raju Ban Gaya Gentleman (1992), and most of them proved to be successes. 

By 1993, she had become one of the most successful stars of Bollywood, by appearing in Hum Hain Rahi Pyar Ke (1993), which established her as a comic actress and for which she won the Filmfare Award for Best Actress , Lootere (1993), which established her beauty standards, the family drama Aaina (1993), and Darr (1993), which established her acting versatility. All these four films proved to be box office successes, and established Chawla's acting career in Bollywood. 

She continued her stardom by appearing in a number of films, including Andaz (1994), Saajan Ka Ghar (1994), Ram Jaane (1995), Naajayaz (1995), Loafer (1996), Deewana Mastana (1997), Yes Boss (1997), Ishq (1997), Mr and Mrs Khiladi  (1997), Duplicate (1998), and Arjun Pandit (1999), and most of them proved to be critical and commercial successes. She received praise for her work in Qayamat Se Qayamat Tak (1988), Swarg (1990), Bol Radha Bol (1992), Aaina (1993), Lootere (1993), Darr (1993), Hum Hain Rahi Pyar Ke (1993), Ram Jaane (1995), Daraar (1996), Yes Boss (1997), Ishq (1997), Deewana Mastana (1997), Mr and Mrs Khiladi  (1997), Saat Rang Ke Sapne (1998), Arjun Pandit (1999), Jhankaar Beats (2003), 3 Deewarein (2003), 7½ Phere (2005), My Brother Nikhil (2005), Bas Ek Pal (2006), Swami (2007), and I Am (2011), and also received praise for her comedic role in Bhoothnath (2008), which was also a commercial success. Her another release of 2008 was the comedy drama Krazzy 4 (2008), which was also a moderate success. She also received praise for her performance in the film.

In 1999, Chawla collaborated with Shahrukh Khan and Aziz Mirza, and formed her own production company along with them, which was named Dreamz Unlimited. Their first productional venture was Phir Bhi Dil Hai Hindustani (2000), which proved to be the thirteenth highest grosser of the year, but failed commercially, it was followed by Aśoka (2001), which was also a commercial failure, and it's commercial failure attributed to a setback. The last feature which Dreamz Unlimited produced was Chalte Chalte (2003), which was a box office success, but after this they parted ways, due to a conflict between the workers. 

Chawla was one of the most successful and leading female stars of Bollywood from late 1980s to early 2000s, and has garnered several accolades for her performances in films, including two Filmfare Awards, and has set a reputation of herself as a comic actress. Critics have particularly commended her comedic ability, and her timing. Several of her films in which she played funny roles, were successful such as Hum Hain Rahi Pyar Ke (1993), Loafer (1996) and Ishq (1997), to name a few. 
In the 2000s, Chawla began developing an interest in art house films, due to their realistic way of portrayal of circumstances and she felt that they were challenging as a performer. Her interest in mainstream films during this time was not much, and hence she took up several non commercial films such Jhankaar Beats (2003), 3 Deewarein (2003), My Brother Nikhil (2005) and 7½ Phere (2005), Bas Ek Pal (2006), Swami (2007), and I Am (2011), all of which garnered her critical acclaim, and she felt satisfied as an actress.

Films

As actress

As producer

Television shows

Notes

References

See also 
 List of awards and nominations received by Juhi Chawla

External links 
 

Indian filmographies
Actress filmographies